An auto-da-fé (from Portuguese  , meaning 'act of faith') was the ritual of public penance (torture) carried out between the 15th and 19th centuries of condemned heretics and apostates imposed by the Spanish, Portuguese, or Mexican Inquisition as punishment and enforced by civil authorities. Its most extreme form was death by burning.

History
From the 8th to the 15th centuries, much of Spain was controlled by Muslims, under whose laws Jews and Christians were given dhimmi status. This meant that they were required to pay a special tax, the jizya, for "protection", intended, as Islamic legal texts indicated, to remind them of their submission. The tax was imposed on the "people of the Book", as Jews and Christians were known, to humble them.

Jews could sometimes rise to important positions in the political structure; anti-Jewish violence could also erupt. In the 1066 Granada massacre, much of the Jewish population of Granada was killed by a Muslim mob.

The treatment of religious minorities varied depending on the era. For example, during their time of ascendance, the Almohads assumed the title of caliph, introduced a series of severe religious measures, and sought to strengthen their states through religious unification, which meant compelling the Jews and Christians to either convert to Islam or be expelled. Around the 11th century, growing suspicions of Jews prompted Christians to unite against the Muslims and Jews. From that point, Spain became a political soup of different powers and territories, each with its own policies regarding the status of Jews and Muslims. By the 13th century almost all of modern Spain was under Christian rule. Ferdinand III of Castile boasted of being the king of three religions.  This tolerance, however, did not last long.

In the 14th century, Dominican and Franciscan priests called on Christians to expel the Jews from Spain, blaming Jews for social problems and stirring the Christian majority to destroy synagogues, burn Jews alive, and impose forced conversion. Jews would be forced to attend sermons and have Christian preachers outline what the Christians viewed as the errors of their ways.

New laws segregated the Jewish population and limited the occupations that were still open to them, with the ultimate goal of conversion. More than 100,000 Jews converted.  Once converted, these New Christians joined the "conversos" class, who were afforded the legal and social privileges of a full Christian in society. Many New Christians took advantage of their elevation in status and embraced Christian privileges. After a few generations, the converted Jews identified as nothing more or less than "regular" Christians, and Spain was almost uniformly Christian.

This uniformity brought with it new sources of anxiety. "The mistrust of the Jew as an outsider gave way to an even more alarming fear of the converso as an insider".  The differences between religious classes had formerly been very clear. Laws and customs codified Christian dominance in Spain. Once the Jews converted, however, many Christian Spaniards believed that they no longer knew whom they could trust and who could possibly be a treacherous heretic at heart.

In an attempt to assuage these fears, Limpieza de sangre (Purity of Blood) laws were put in place that traced the bloodline of Christians New and Old to see if they had Jewish ancestry. In doing so, Spain divided its Christian class along ethnic and religious lines, "othering" those with Jewish blood much as it had prior to conversion.  Influential Christians believed that there was something different in the essence and soul of the person that could not be cured by religious conversion. With these laws came the resurgence of the blood libel.

On 1 November 1478, Ferdinand II of Aragon and Isabella I of Castile received permission from Pope Sixtus IV to name inquisitors throughout their domains in order to protect Catholicism as the one true Christian faith. The decree originally applied to the Crown of Castile—the domain of Isabella—but in 1483 Ferdinand extended it to his domain of the Crown of Aragon. Autos-da-fé became quite popular throughout the Spanish realm, competing with bullfights for the public's attention and attended by royalty. Though Ferdinand's action met with occasional resistance and resulted in the assassination of the inquisitor Pedro de Arbués by converted Jews in 1485, between 1487 and 1505 the processing and trying of more than 1,000 heretics was recorded by the Barcelona chapter, of whom only 25 were ultimately absolved.<ref name=tv3>«La Inquisició» , Històries de Catalunya, TV3, s.d.</ref>

Once granted permission from the Pope to conduct inquisitions, the monarchs began establishing permanent trials and developing bureaucracies to carry out investigations in most of the cities and communities in their empire. The first Iberian auto-da-fé took place in Seville in 1481: the six accused were found guilty and executed. Later, Franciscan missionaries brought the Inquisition to the New World.

The exact number of people executed by the Inquisition is not known. Juan Antonio Llorente, the ex-secretary of the Holy Office, gave the following numbers for the Inquisition excluding the American colonies, Sicily and Sardinia: 31,912 burnt, 17,696 burned in effigy, and 291,450 reconciled de vehementi (i.e., following an act of penance). Later in the nineteenth century, José Amador de los Ríos gave even higher numbers, stating that between the years 1484 and 1525 alone, 28,540 were burned in person, 16,520 burned in effigy and 303,847 penanced. However, after extensive examinations of archival records, modern scholars provide lower estimates, indicating that fewer than 10,000 were actually executed during the whole history of the Spanish Inquisition, perhaps around 3,000.

The Portuguese Inquisition was established in 1536 and lasted officially until 1821. Its influence was much weakened by the late 18th century under the government of the Marquês de Pombal.Autos-da-fé also took place in Goa, New Spain, the State of Brazil, and the Viceroyalty of Peru. Contemporary historians of the Conquistadors, such as Bernal Díaz del Castillo, recorded them. Although records are incomplete, one historian estimates that about 50 people were executed by the Mexican Inquisition.

 Process 

The auto-da-fé was a major aspect of the tribunals, and the final step in the Inquisition process. It involved a Catholic Mass, prayer, a public procession of those found guilty, and a reading of their sentences.

An Inquisition usually began with the public proclamation of a grace period of 40 days. Anyone who was guilty or knew of someone who was guilty was urged to confess. If the accused were charged, they were presumed guilty. Officials could apply torture during the trial. Inquisitors were required to hear and record all testimony. Proceedings were to be kept secret, and the identity of witnesses was not known to the accused.

Officials proclaimed the prisoner's sentence after the trial and administered it in an auto-da-fé. The auto-da-fé was not an impromptu event, but thoroughly orchestrated. Preparations began a month in advance and only occurred when the inquisition authorities believed there were enough prisoners in a given community or city. The ritual took place in public squares or esplanades and lasted several hours with ecclesiastical and civil authorities in attendance.

An all-night vigil would be held in or near the city's plaza, with prayers, ending in Mass at daybreak and a breakfast feast prepared for all who joined in.

The ceremony of public penitence then began with a procession of prisoners, who bore elaborate visual symbols on their garments and bodies. These symbols were called sanbenito, and were made of yellow sackcloth. They served to identify the specific acts of heresy of the accused, whose identities were kept secret until the very last moment. In addition, the prisoners usually had no idea what the outcome of their trial had been or their sentencing.

The prisoners were taken to a place called the quemadero or burning place, sometimes located outside the city walls. There the sentences were read. Prisoners who were acquitted or whose sentence was suspended would fall on their knees in thanksgiving, but the condemned would be punished. Artistic representations of the auto-da-fé usually depict physical punishment such as whipping, torture, and burning at the stake.

The auto-da-fé was also a form of penitence for the public viewers, because they too were engaging in a process of reconciliation and by being involved were given the chance to confront their sins and be forgiven by the Church.

In popular culture

The auto-da-fé, usually represented as a heretic being burned at the stake, is a symbol used widely in the arts, especially in Europe.

Voltaire featured an auto-da-fé held by the people of Lisbon after the 1755 Lisbon earthquake in chapter six of his satire Candide (1759). The university of Coimbra decides that this "great ceremony was an infallible means of preventing the earth from quaking."
Edgar Allan Poe – In "The Pit and the Pendulum", Poe uses the auto-da-fé as a reference point for the narrator as he tries to determine what is happening to him.
Giuseppe Verdi – In his 1866 opera Don Carlos, Verdi includes a pivotal scene in the third act that depicts the beginning of an auto-da-fé in front of the Cathedral of Valladolid in Spain where heretics are about to be burned at the stake.
Herman Melville – In Moby-Dick, near the end of Chapter 54, mentions auto-da-fé in passing: Though there are no Auto-da-Fe's in Lima now,' said one of the company to another; 'I fear our sailor friend runs the risk of the archiepiscopacy. Let us withdraw more out of the moonlight. I see no need of this. In "The Confidence-Man: His Masquerade" (1857), set on a Mississippi steamboat filled with colorful characters and the Devil himself as the con-man, Melville weaves an allegory on how easily one may win over a person's, or for that matter, an entire people's confidence. The story begins and ends with the appearance of mysterious young men, the latter of whom is described as wearing tattered red and yellow clothes reminiscent of "a victim in auto-da-fe.” The book opens with the words "Dedicated to victims of Auto da Fe."
Leonard Bernstein composed and produced a musical adaptation of Voltaire's Candide in 1956, featuring a song called Auto-da-Fé that includes the chorus, "It's a lovely day for drinking and for watching people fry," referring to the spectacle of public executions.
Elias Canetti won the Nobel Prize in Literature in 1981 for his work, especially his novel Die Blendung (1935), literally "The Blinding", translated into English as Auto-da-Fé (1946).
Fyodor Dostoevsky begins a chapter of The Brothers Karamazov with a "splendid Auto-da-Fé". The chapter is famously called "The Grand Inquisitor".
In Thornton Wilder's 1927 novel The Bridge of San Luis Rey, a central character, the friar Brother Juniper, is burned for heresy in an auto-da-fé in early 18th-century Peru. Although the novel is fictional, autos-de-fé did occur in Lima, Peru at least as late as 1733. 
Tennessee Williams wrote a one-act play entitled Auto-da-Fé (1938).
Roger Zelazny wrote a short story, Auto-da-Fé, which appeared in Dangerous Visions, 1967.
In Dai Sijie's Balzac and the Little Chinese Seamstress, the final climactic book burning is repeatedly referred to as auto-da-fé.Man of La Mancha, 1965 musical with a book by Dale Wasserman. It tells the story of the "mad" knight Don Quixote as a play within a play, performed by Cervantes and his fellow prisoners as he awaits a hearing with the Spanish Inquisition.

References
Notes

Bibliography
 Arouet, Francois-Marie (Voltaire) (1758). Candide Dedieu, Jean-Pierre (1987) L'Inquisition. Les Editions Fides
 Goldstein, Phyllis. A Convenient Hatred: The History of Antisemitism. (Brookline: Facing History and Ourselves National Foundation, 2012)
 Kamen, Henry. (1997) The Spanish Inquisition : A Historical Revision. London: Weidenfeld & Nicolson.
 Lea, Henry Charles (1906–1907). A History of the Inquisition of Spain (4 volumes) - vol.1,vol.2,vol.3,vol.4. New York and London.
 Monter, William (1990). Frontiers of Heresy. The Spanish Inquisition from the Basque Land to Sicily. Cambridge University Press
 Perez, Joseph (2006) The Spanish Inquisition: A History, Yale University Press. , 
 Peters, Edward. (1988) Inquisition. New York: The Free Press.
 Rawlings, Helen. The Spanish Inquisition: The Historiography of the Inquisition. (Malden: Blackwell Publishers, 2006).
 Roth, Cecil. The Spanish Inquisition. (W.W Norton & Company, New York Press, 1964)
 Stavans, Ilan. (2005) The Schocken Book of Modern Sephardic Literature. Random House, Inc. New York
 Whitechapel, Simon (2003). Flesh Inferno: Atrocities of Torquemada and the Spanish Inquisition. Creation Books. 
 Yerushalmi, Yosef Hayim. Assimilation and Racial Anti-Semitism: The Iberian and the German Models. (Leo Baeck Institute, New York Press, 1982). 
 Miscelanea de Zapata'', Mem. histórico español: colección de documentos, opúsculos y antigüedades que publica la Real Academia de la Historia (in Spanish, 1851) vol.XI, p.202

External links 

  La Inquisición Española: origen, desarrollo, organización, administración, métodos y proceso inquisitorial
 

Jewish Portuguese history
Jewish Spanish history
Portuguese Inquisition
Spanish Inquisition
Christian terminology
History of the conversos